The World Needs More Skillz is a 2010 album by rapper Skillz. The track "Adam" is a dedication song to DJ AM that was recorded shortly after his death.

Track listing
 Celebrate Life (feat. Travis Barker) (D. Lewis, I. Barias) (3:28)
 Regular Guy (D. Lewis, K. Holland) (4:01)
 Wants and Needs (feat. Bilal) (D. Lewis, I. Barias, C. Haggins, B. Oliver) (3:22)
 Call Me Crazy (feat. Raheem DeVaughn) (D. Lewis, J. Scott) (3:59)
 Superbad (D. Lewis, D. DeSandies, M. Youssef) (3:42)
 Enjoying the View (feat. Joe Tann) (D. Lewis, J. Wright, J. McMinn) (3:22) 
 The World Needs More Skillz (I Gotchu) (D. Lewis, Q. Johnson) (3:11)
 Flash of Genius (D. Lewis, E. Osborne, T.S. Myrie, D. Grant) (3:36)
 Going Up  (D. Lewis, R. Baker) (4:52)
 R.N.I.T.R. (D. Lewis, T. Tellington) (3:42)
 Good Money (D. Lewis, R. Baker) (3:52)
 Adam (D. Lewis, R. Moore) (4:23)
 Still Standing (D. Lewis, J. Bibbs, R. Baker, D. Scott) (4:25)

Personnel
 Johnnie "Smurf" Smith: additional piano
 Curt Broadie: bass
 Shaliek, Coco Sarai, Be Bop, Bear Witnez, Daisy Grant, Sean Faylon, Jon Bibbs: additional vocals
 Ivan "Orthodox" Barias, Kwame, A Kid Named Cus, Dustin Baker, Skillz, Ray Baker: recording engineers
 A Kid Named Cus: mixing

References

Skillz albums
2010 albums